Tieshan District is a district of the prefecture-level city of Huangshi, Hubei province, People's Republic of China. Small in area, it is squeezed between the "county-level city" Daye to the south and west, Huangshi's Xialu District to the east, and the prefecture-level city of Ezhou to the north. Physically, it is a small mining town.

As its name indicates ("Tieshan" means  "Iron Mountain"), the district owes its existence to  iron-ore mines.

The town is served by China National Highway 106, which also doubles as China National Highway 316 in this part of Hubei.

The only administrative direct subdivision is a town-simulating village.

References

County-level divisions of Hubei
Mining communities in China
Huangshi